Chaz Bear (born Chazwick Bradley Bundick; November 7, 1986), known professionally as Toro y Moi, is an American singer, songwriter, record producer, and graphic designer. He is often recognized as a spearhead of the chillwave genre in the 2010s, alongside contemporaries Washed Out and Neon Indian, although his music has explored various styles since. His stage name is a multilingual expression consisting of the Spanish words toro and y (meaning "bull" and "and", respectively) and the French word moi (meaning "me").

Early life
Chaz Bear was born on November 7, 1986, in Columbia, South Carolina, to a Filipino mother and an African American father. He attended Ridge View High School, where he formed the indie rock band the Heist and the Accomplice with three schoolmates.

Bear graduated from the University of South Carolina in spring of 2009 with a bachelor's degree in graphic design. Late in his school career, Toro y Moi formed a close musical relationship with fellow chillwave artist Ernest Greene, who performs under the name Washed Out.

Career

2010: Causers of This
In mid-2009, Bear was signed to Carpark Records, on which he released his debut Toro y Moi full-length album, Causers of This, in January 2010. On Causers of This, Bear experimented with sampling and production techniques using the digital audio workstation Reason. The album garnered comparisons to the "chillwave" subgenre; however, Bear stated that he never classified his music as such. Bear refers to the album's subject matter as "personal," calling it a "break-up album." Tours supporting Ruby Suns, Caribou, and Phoenix followed the album's release.

2011: Underneath the Pine and Freaking Out EP
Bear's second album, Underneath the Pine, was released on February 22, 2011. The album was recorded at Bear's home between tours while supporting Causers of This. Underneath the Pine marked a stylistic departure from the previous album in that it was made up of all live instrumentation and contained no samples. Bear cites horror movie soundtracks, space disco, and film composers Piero Umiliani and François de Roubaix as inspiration for the album's sound. Further, Bear states that "...what influenced Underneath the Pine was finding stuff that I wanted to sample for Causers. A lot of the things I sampled for Causers ended up being the main musical inspiration for Underneath the Pine."

In an interview with the website At the Sinema, he suggested that he had moved beyond the chillwave genre: "All that stuff is really good music, like Ernest Green (Washed Out) and Neon Indian. I'm a big fan of all of that, but I think [chillwave] was just a small little period where we all were, coincidentally."

On September 13, 2011, Toro y Moi released an EP titled Freaking Out, featuring a cover of "Saturday Love" by Cherrelle and Alexander O'Neal. The EP's sound was heavily influenced by 80's Boogie and R&B.

The band was chosen by Caribou to perform at the ATP Nightmare Before Christmas festival that they co-curated in December 2011 in Minehead, England.

2012–2013: Anything in Return
In January 2013, Bear released his third Toro y Moi studio album, Anything in Return, which he described as having a '90s dance and R&B sound. According to him, the album was "influenced by lots of different types of house, from deep house to two-step [...] The chords ['Harm in Change' and 'Say That'] use—that's just something I've been a fan of for a while. I really wanted to mess around with those kinds of elements and revisit what I did on Causers of This, but make those elements a little bit better and more apparent." The album was called "highly indebted to the late sacrosanct hip-hop producer J Dilla" by the San Francisco Bay Guardian. Bear stated that he wanted to combine the electronic production of his first record with the elements of traditional instrumentation of his second album.

2014–2015: What For? and Samantha mixtape
Bear released What For?, his fourth studio album as Toro y Moi, on April 7, 2015, on Carpark Records. The album marked a further departure in sound from previous releases with a guitar-based rock sound, drawing inspiration from artists such as Big Star, Talking Heads, Todd Rundgren, Tim Maia, and Cortex.

Later that year, Bear released the hip hop–influenced mixtape Samantha via a Dropbox link. The free, 20-track mixtape features collaborations with Washed Out, Rome Fortune and Nosaj Thing, among others.

2016–2017: Live from Trona and Boo Boo
In April 2016, Bear traveled with his touring band to the Mojave Desert to film a live concert film and album. The concert, which had no audience, was filmed in a single day among the Trona Pinnacles. The band added Bay Area multi-instrumentalist Brijean Murphy on congas, and were joined by The Mattson 2 to play the song "JBS". Bear shared with The Fader that the film was inspired by Pink Floyd's Live At Pompeii, which featured a live performance without an audience.

The film, directed by Harry Israelson, premiered online in August 2016. The live recording was released as a double LP by Carpark Records in August as well.

The studio album follow up to What For?, Boo Boo, was released on July 7, 2017, by Carpark Records. In creating Boo Boo, Bear was influenced by an eclectic mix of Daft Punk, Frank Ocean, Travis Scott, and Oneohtrix Point Never. Boo Boo moved back towards a more R&B, electronic sound, diverging from the live instrumentation of What For?.

2018–2021: Outer Peace and Soul Trash mixtape
Bear released the sixth Toro y Moi album, Outer Peace, on January 18, 2019, on Carpark Records. Outer Peace is arguably the most pop-influenced Toro y Moi album to date. Tracks like "Ordinary Pleasure" and "Freelance" showcase the continued funk, disco, and house influence that is woven through the entire Toro y Moi discography. On First Listen with NPR in January 2019, Bear explained a bit about the album title, stating that "usually the peace is within, so to have peace on the outside is the challenge. I kind of just wanted to call that out."

A week after the release of Outer Peace and while on tour supporting the album, Bear shared a Dropbox link to a cassette bounce of his newest mixtape, Soul Trash. In October 2019, an updated version of Soul Trash was released on streaming platforms. The official release was accompanied by a psychedelic short film directed by Bay Area artist Laneya Billingsley.

In late 2019, Bear started working with Flume on the drum and bass-inspired track "The Difference", which was released on March 11, 2020. The song was nominated for a Grammy Award for Best Dance Recording for 2020.

In October 2021, Bear announced that he had signed with Dead Oceans to release the next Toro y Moi album in progress.

2022–present: Mahal
On January 26, 2022, Bear announced his seventh studio album as Toro y Moi, Mahal, alongside the release of its first two singles, "Postman" and "Magazine". Two more singles "The Loop" and "Déjà Vu" were released on February 22 and March 31 that year, respectively. The album was released on April 29 via Dead Oceans.

Side projects

Les Sins (2014–present)
Bear DJs and makes electronic dance music under the moniker Les Sins. As Les Sins, Bear has put out a series of 12-inch records on Carpark Records and Jiaolong Records. Bear stated that Les Sins "was just another way to make weirder music without having to feel I'm alienating Toro y Moi [fans]. So it's kind of nice to do whatever kind of song I want to do without having to worry about it being accessible." Les Sins's debut full-length album, Michael, was released on November 4, 2014, on Bear's own Company Records (now called Company Studio). The next Les Sins release was a split EP with New York house music producer AceMo called C'mon Les' Go, released on August 27, 2020, by Company Studio.

Plum (2016–present)
Bear produces and performs ambient music as Plum. The first Plum release was a self-titled single-track tape that came out on Leaving Records on September 28, 2016. The next Plum release was a full-length called StreetView released on Company Studio on October 24, 2020. StreetView's release was accompanied by the debut of an immersive website, plum.link, that paired streaming of the album with drone footage and effects that enhanced the experience of the music.

Chaz Bundick Meets the Mattson 2 (2016–2017)
Bear released a collaborative album, Star Stuff, with The Mattson 2, a jazz duo from California. Star Stuff was released on Company Records on March 31, 2017, and subsequently reached #1 on the contemporary jazz Billboard Charts. While touring together in support of Star Stuff, Bear and the Mattson 2 performed their collaborative album alongside existing songs from Toro y Moi's catalog.

Art and design work
Alongside his music career, Bear also maintains a visual art and design practice. In 2016, Bear founded Company Studio as a framework and vehicle for his visual endeavors. Company Studio works across various disciplines including graphic design, art direction, fine art, murals and installations, event production, and video production.

Bear's fine art is primarily centered around painting, but also includes drawing, collage, and sculpture. Bear has had solo shows in at New Image Art (Los Angeles), FISK Projects (Portland), and Gallery Commune (Tokyo).

Company Studio is also the name of Bear's record label, an imprint under Carpark Records, on which he releases his own side projects as well as records by selected artists that he has produced.

Band members

Live
Chaz Bear vocals, guitar, and keyboards (2008–present)
Patrick Jeffords bass (2010–present)
Andy Woodward drums (2010–present)
Jordan Blackmon guitar (2011–2017)
Anthony Ferraro keyboards and backing vocals (2013–present)
Brijean Murphy percussion (2016–present)

Personal life
Bear lives and works in the San Francisco Bay Area, where he moved after leaving South Carolina. On June 27, 2017, the city of Berkeley, California officially declared June 27 to be 'Chaz Bundick Day'. This public recognition of Bear's contribution to music and the arts was presented by Jesse Arreguin, Mayor of Berkeley.

Discography

Studio albums

Compilation albums

Mixtapes
 Guest Mix for Andrew Meza's BTS Radio (2012)
 Boiler Room Los Angeles Mix (2012)
 Samantha (2015)
 Soul Trash (2019)

Live albums
 Live from Trona (2016)

EPs
 Body Angles (2009)
 Sides of Chaz (2010)
 Freaking Out (2011)
 smartbeats (for Glaceau Smartwater) (2019)
 C'mon Les' Go (as Les Sins) (split with AceMo) (2020)

Singles
 "Left Alone at Night" (2009)
 "Blessa" (2009)
 "Leave Everywhere" (2010)
 "I Will Talk to You" / "For No Reason" (split 7-inch with Cloud Nothings) (2011)
 "So Many Details" (2012)
 "Say That" (2013)
 "Campo" (2013)
 "Slough" (2013)
 "Empty Nesters" (2015)
 "Buffalo" (2015)
 "Grown Up Calls (Live)" (2016)
 "Girl Like You" (2017)
 "You and I" (2017)
 "Omaha" (2017)
 "Freelance" (2018)
 "Ordinary Pleasure" (2018)
 "The Difference" (with Flume) (2020)
 "Ordinary Guy" (with The Mattison 2) (2020)
 "Postman" / "Magazine" (2022)
 "The Loop" (2022)
 "Déjà Vu" (2022)

Music videos 
 "Blessa" (2009)
 "Talamak" (2010)
 "Low Shoulders" (2010)
 "Still Sound" (2011)
 "New Beat" (2011)
 "How I Know" (2011)
 "So Many Details" (2012)
 "Say That" (2013)
 "Never Matter" (2013)
 "Rose Quartz" (2013)
 "Empty Nesters" (2015)
 "Half Dome" (2015)
 "Lilly" (2015)
 "Girl Like You" (2017)
 "You and I" (2017)
 "Windows" (2017)
 "Pavement" (2017)
 "No Show" (2017)
 "Omaha" (2017)
 "Freelance" (2018)
 "Ordinary Pleasure" (2019)
 "50-50" (2019)
 "drip bounce _7_24_18" (2019)
 "New House" (2019)
 "Magazine" (2022)
 "Postman" (2022)
 "The Loop" (2022)
 "Déjá Vu" (2022)
 "Millennium" (2022)

Demo albums
 Woodlands (2007)
 My Touch (2009)

As producer
 Sunday Dinner by Keath Mead (2015)
 Signals EP by Madeline Kenney (2016)
 Radiolove EP by Tanukichan (2016)
 Night Night at First Landing by Madeline Kenney (2017)
 Star Stuff by Chaz Bundick Meets The Mattson 2 (2017)
 Toro y Rome Vol.1 (with Rome Fortune) (2018)
 Sundays by Tanukichan (2018)
 Living in Symbol by Astronauts, etc. (2018)
 Rhododendron by Valley Maker (2018)

As featured artist

Remixes

References

External links

 
 Self-Titled Mag interview
 Toro y Moi mixtape on Andrew Meza's BTS Radio
 
 Toro y Moi article on NPR

1986 births
21st-century American singers
African-American male singers
American male singers
African-American record producers
Record producers from South Carolina
American electronic musicians
American indie pop musicians
American musicians of Filipino descent
American synth-pop musicians
American graphic designers
Chillwave musicians
Filipino people of African-American descent
Hypnagogic pop musicians
Living people
Musicians from Columbia, South Carolina
Remixers
Synth-pop singers
University of South Carolina alumni